Love on a Diet is a 2001 Hong Kong romantic comedy film produced and directed by Johnnie To and Wai Ka-fai, starring Andy Lau and Sammi Cheng.

The film reunites Lau and Cheng, who last paired up in 2000's Needing You....  For their roles, both actors play obese characters and had to wear fatsuits with prosthetic makeup.

Plot

Mini Mo (Sammi Cheng) is a Hong Kong resident living in Japan.  She suffers from depression, low self-esteem and a binge eating disorder – the result which sees her suffers from extreme obesity. A suicide attempt causes her to meet Fatso (Andy Lau), a Hong Kong salesman working in Japan who is also obese.

Mini sticks with Fatso everywhere, and although initially vexed by Mini, Fatso discovers the reason behind her depression. Mini cannot forget her former boyfriend, Kurokawa, who is now a world-famous pianist. Ten years ago, the two had pledged to meet at the foot of Yokohama Marine Tower on the night of their break-up. Mini is fearful of meeting Kurokawa in her present size. Touched by her story and her sweet nature, Fatso promises to whip her back into shape.

After trying desperate means of losing weight (such as swallowing tapeworms and exercising to Dance Dance Revolution), Mini finally sheds pounds. But Fatso finds his funds running low. To earn enough to finance Mini's weight-loss programs, he opens a boxing gig on the streets allowing on-lookers to punch him to vent their pent-up frustrations. He next enrolls Mini on an expensive weight-loss program, which proves to be very successful. Mini regains her former slim and pretty look.

On the night of her reunion with Kurokawa, Fatso drops Mini off at Tokyo Tower and she meets up with former beau under the gazing eyes of the local media. The pair are interviewed by a local network, but Mini notices another broadcast featuring Fatso's street boxing gig.  She finally realizes how much Fatso has sacrificed himself for her and is moved to tears. Turning to apologize to Kurokawa, she leaves hastily.

Months later, Mini publishes a bestseller on dieting, and finds a slimmed-down Fatso carrying her book in a park. The two kiss, promising never to leave each other again.

Cast
 Andy Lau as Fatso
 Sammi Cheng as Mini Mo
 Wong Tin-lam as Fatso's fat friend
 Lam Suet as Bun Man
 Rikiya Kurokawa as Kurokawa
 Kenji Sato as Fatso's boxing customer
 Asuka Higuchi as Ms. Kudo
 Wong Mei-fan as Radio DJ
 Po Ming-nam as Cocaine Ken
 Hung Wai-leung as Fatso's fat friend
 Cheung Chi-ping as Fatso's fat friend
 Cheng Kam-cheung as Fatso's fat friend
 Lo Ching-ting

Awards and nominations

Trivia
 Fatso's car is a Mitsubishi Minica Toppo

External links

 

2001 films
2001 romantic comedy films
Hong Kong romantic comedy films
Films about obesity
Films set in Japan
Films shot in Japan
2000s Japanese-language films
2000s Cantonese-language films
China Star Entertainment Group films
Milkyway Image films
Films directed by Johnnie To
Films directed by Wai Ka-Fai
Films with screenplays by Yau Nai-hoi
Films with screenplays by Wai Ka-fai
Japan in non-Japanese culture
2000s Hong Kong films